Michelle McGann (born December 30, 1969) is an American professional golfer who plays on the LPGA Tour.

Amateur career
Born in West Palm Beach, Florida, McGann was diagnosed with juvenile diabetes at age 13 and was a three-time Florida state junior champion. She won the 1987 U.S. Girls' Junior and was named American Junior Golf Association Rolex Junior Player of the Year.

Also in 1987, she was named a Rolex Junior First-Team All-American and was ranked as the nation's top amateur by Golf Magazine and Golf Digest. In 1988, McGann captured the Doherty Cup Championship title and played in the U.S. Women's Open and Boston Five Classic as an amateur.

Professional career
McGann joined the LPGA Tour in 1989 and has seven LPGA career victories. She was a member of the 1996 U.S. Solheim Cup team and finished in the top-10 on the money list twice, seventh in 1995 and eighth in 1996. McGann began using an insulin pump in 1999 and is the founder and chairperson of the Michelle McGann Fund, a 501c3 charity focused on diabetes education and awareness. She became engaged to Jonathan Satter, a business executive and political appointee, in July 2008, and they were married in May 2010.

Health
McGann's career has long been hampered by her battle with type 1 diabetes and related effects.

Endorsements
McGann has represented Cadillac, Bayer, Lynx, Lilly Pulitzer, Canon, and Tommy Bahama.

Professional wins

LPGA Tour wins (7)

LPGA Tour playoff record (4–0)

LPGA of Japan Tour (1)
1995 Takara World Invitational

Other (1)
1998 Gillette Tour Challenge Championship (with Lee Trevino and Jim Furyk)

Team appearances
Professional
Solheim Cup (representing the United States): 1996 (winners)

External links

Charitable Foundation.

American female golfers
LPGA Tour golfers
Solheim Cup competitors for the United States
Golfers from Florida
People with type 1 diabetes
Sportspeople from West Palm Beach, Florida
People from North Palm Beach, Florida
1969 births
Living people
21st-century American women